Wusheng may refer to:

Place
Wusheng County (武胜县), a county in eastern Sichuan, China
Wusheng Township (武圣乡), a township in Muchuan County, Sichuan, China
Wusheng Subdistrict (武圣街道), a subdistrict of Baita District, Liaoyang, Liaoning, China
Sheng role#Wusheng (武生, "martial gentlemen"), a male role type in Chinese opera

People
Wu Sheng (academic), Chinese nuclear material and process specialist and academic, member of the Chinese Academy of Engineering.

See also
Guan Yu (died 220), Han dynasty general who became a deity in Chinese folk religion, often called "Wusheng" (武聖; "Saint of War")